was a Japanese rapist and serial killer. He killed at least seven girls. He murdered his first victim in 1906, and killed six girls between 1923 and 1924. He was tried for three out of six cases, but his exact number of victims is unknown.

He raped a number of women besides the murder victims and according to one theory, he raped 93 girls and about 100 women. Some estimates say he raped more than 100 women.

Early life 
He was born in Shimogyō-ku, Kyoto. His family forced him to work at the age of eight. He frequently changed jobs. At the age of 11, he had sex with a girl about 17 years old, for which he lost his job. At 12, he was arrested for theft. Fukiage learned kana and math during the two months he spent in jail. He was arrested again for theft soon after his release, but learned classical Chinese while in jail the second time.

Fukiage had sex with a 54-year-old woman at the age of 17. He later raped the woman's 11-year-old daughter and some other girls in their neighborhood.

First murder and imprisonment
On September 24, 1906, he raped and murdered an 11-year-old girl at Kinkaku-ji. The victim was an acquaintance of his. At the time he was culturally considered to be 18 years old, although he was 17 years old under the western age system. In jail, he studied the works of Confucius, Mencius, Socrates, Aristotle and Nichiren. He was released in 1922 and found employment, but he was fired due to his criminal past. In April 1923, he was arrested for molesting a four-year-old girl, but was released.

Later murders and arrest

Between June 1923 and April 1924, he raped and murdered six girls, ages 11 to 16. He was arrested on July 28, 1924. He confessed to 13 murders, but later recanted, and insisting that he had murdered only six girls and that a police officer had asked him a leading question. He wrote a book, . He was sentenced to death on May 17, 1925. The Supreme Court of Japan upheld his death sentence on July 2, 1926.

Execution
He was executed by hanging on September 28, 1926. The media reported that he went to die nobly, unlike many prisoners. In his book, he requested that parents take care of their children.

Books 
娑婆 (translation The Street, publisher Ganshodo-shoten, Japan 1926) by himself
ドキュメント・連続少女殺人―孤高の鬼・吹上佐太郎 (translation Document; Serial Girl Murders—The Isolated Devil, Fukiage Satarō, publisher PAROL-SHA, Japan 1993)
身の毛もよだつ殺人者たち (translation Horrible Murderers, publisher Takarajimasha, Japan 2006) - One chapter in the book treats Satarō Fukiage.

See also 
Kiyoshi Ōkubo
Tsutomu Miyazaki
List of serial killers by country

References

External links 
 The article on Fikiage Satarō written by Atusi Hachisu 
 The Fukiage Satarō Incident written by yabusaka

1889 births
1926 deaths
20th-century executions by Japan
Executed Japanese serial killers
Japanese murderers of children
Japanese non-fiction writers
Japanese people convicted of murder
Japanese rapists
Male serial killers
People convicted of murder by Japan
People executed by Japan by hanging
People from Kyoto